Daniel Charles Cuthbert (2 February 1846 – 6 July 1912) was an Australian cricketer. He played two first-class matches for Tasmania between 1868 and 1878. Cuthbert was a law conveyancer in Hobart, and worked for the firm Butler, McIntyre & Butler.

See also
 List of Tasmanian representative cricketers

References

External links
 

1846 births
1912 deaths
Australian cricketers
Tasmania cricketers
Cricketers from Tasmania